The 2006 congressional elections in Hawaii were held on November 7, 2006 to determine who was to represent the state of Hawaii in the United States House of Representatives for the 111th Congress. Hawaii has two seats in the House, apportioned according to the 2000 United States Census. Representatives are elected for two-year terms.

Overview

District 1 

 

Incumbent Democrat Neil Abercrombie defeated Republican Richard Hough. This district covers the southern portion of the island, city, and county of Honolulu.

District 2 

 

Incumbent Democrat Ed Case decided to retire, in order to run for the U.S. Senate. Democrat Mazie Hirono, a former Lieutenant Governor, defeated Republican Bob Hogue, a State Senator. She became the first Buddhist to be elected to the U.S. Congress.

References 

2006 Hawaii elections
Hawaii

2006